The Old Man of the South Pole (in  or ) is the Taoist deification of Canopus, the brightest star of the constellation Carina.

It is the symbol of happiness and longevity in Far Eastern culture.

Description
The Old Man of the South Pole is often depicted in Chinese pictures as an old man with a long white beard with a deer by his side. This style of picture is related to the story of an emperor of the Northern Song Dynasty, who had invited such an old man from the street and later considered the old man as the sign of his longevity.

In Chinese, Canopus is usually called the Star of the Old Man (in ) or the Star of the Old Man of the South Pole (in ). Since Carina is a Southern constellation, Canopus is rarely seen in Northern China and, if seen in good weather, looks reddish lying near the southern horizon. Because the color red is the symbol of happiness and longevity in China, Canopus is also known in China and the neighboring countries of Korea, Japan, and Vietnam as the Star of Old Age (in ) or the Star of the Man of the Old Age (in ). In Japan, it became Jurōjin (in ), one of the Seven Gods of Fortune (in ).

Legend
According to legend, the Old Man of the South Pole was once a sickly boy named Zhao Yen who had been predicted to die when he was 19 years old. He was therefore advised to visit a certain field and to bring with him a jar of wine and dried meat. In that field, he would find two men intent on playing checkers under a tree. He should offer them wine and meat, but should avoid answering their questions. Zhao Yen followed the advice and when the two men had consumed the meat and the wine, they decided to thank him by exchanging the figures of his life expectancy from 19 to 91 years. Later he was told that one of the two men was the star of the North Pole, which fixes the date of birth of the men, and the other the star of the South Pole, which fixes the date of death.

See also

Fukurokuju
Jurōjin
Sanxing (deities)
Sagaan Ubgen

References

Canopus
Chinese gods
Investiture of the Gods characters
Journey to the West characters
Stellar gods
Deities in Taoism
Deified Chinese people